Richard of Gloucester or Richard Fitz Robert was appointed bishop of Bayeux in France in 1138 and died in 1142. He was the eldest son of Robert, 1st Earl of Gloucester, but he was illegitimate. His mother was Isabel of Dover, daughter of Samson of Worcester, Bishop of Worcester.

He was the nephew of Richard de Douvres, his predecessor in the see of Bayeux.

Biography 
His father obtained the see of Bayeux by the support he gave to King . 

Richard donated the church and the dîme d'Isigny to the cathedral chapter in 1138. The same year, he consecrated the Abbey of Ardenne, dedicated in honour of the Blessed Virgin.

References

Date of birth unknown
1142 deaths
Bishops of Bayeux